The 2006 Southland Conference baseball tournament was held from May 24 through 27, 2006 to determine the champion of the Southland Conference in the sport of college baseball for the 2006 season.  The event pitted the top six finishers from the conference's regular season in a double-elimination tournament held at Vincent–Beck Stadium, home field of Lamar in Beaumont, Texas.  Fifth-seeded  won their second overall championship and claimed the automatic bid to the 2006 NCAA Division I baseball tournament.

Seeding and format
The top six finishers from the regular season were seeded one through six.  They played a double-elimination tournament.

Bracket and results

All-Tournament Team
The following players were named to the All-Tournament Team.

Most Valuable Player
Ryan Riddle was named Tournament Most Valuable Player.  Riddle was a pitcher for Texas–Arlington.

References

Tournament
Southland Conference Baseball Tournament
Southland Conference baseball tournament
Southland Conference baseball tournament